Dr. Lucy Dupuy Montz House is a historical building in Warsaw, Kentucky that was the location of Lucy Dupuy Montz home residence and dental practice. Montz was Kentucky's first woman dentist. In 1978, the building was listed on the National Register of Historic Places.

References

Warsaw Historic District (Warsaw, Kentucky)

National Register of Historic Places in Gallatin County, Kentucky
Federal architecture in Kentucky
Houses completed in 1825
1825 establishments in Kentucky
Houses on the National Register of Historic Places in Kentucky
History of dentistry
Individually listed contributing properties to historic districts on the National Register in Kentucky